Oliver Howard Vaughton (9 January 1861 – 6 January 1937) was an England international footballer who played as an inside left.

Vaughton played for England on five occasions, scoring six goals. Five of his goals were scored in a 13–0 victory over Ireland in Belfast on 18 February 1882, with his Villa team-mate Arthur Brown contributing four.

After his football career ended he ran a silversmith's firm and was charged with making a new FA Cup after the original disappeared in mysterious circumstances in 1895.

He died in Birmingham on 6 January 1937, three days before what would have been his 76th birthday.

References 

1861 births
1937 deaths
Association football inside forwards
Aston Villa F.C. players
England international footballers
English footballers
FA Cup Final players